Eternal is the fifth album by the Swiss heavy metal band Samael, released on 19 July 1999 via Century Media.

Track listing

Personnel

Samael
 Vorph – guitar, vocals, production
 Kaos – guitar, production
 Masmiseim – bass, production
 Xytras – keyboard, drums, percussion, production

Technical personnel
 David Richards – recording, engineering, mixing
 Kris Fredriksson – assistant engineering
 Rodrigue Pellaud – front cover artwork, fractals
 Carsten Drescher – layout, design
 Tony Cousins – mastering

Chart positions

References

1999 albums
Samael (band) albums
Century Media Records albums

pl:Eternal